P55 or P-55 may refer to:

Vessels 
 , a patrol boat of the Argentine Navy
 , a submarine of the Royal Navy
 , a patrol vessel of the Royal New Zealand Navy
 , a patrol vessel of the Indian Navy

Other uses 
 Curtiss-Wright XP-55 Ascender, an American experimental fighter aircraft
 Intel P55, a computer chipset
 Papyrus 55, a biblical manuscript
 PIK3R3, phosphatidylinositol 3-kinase regulatory subunit gamma
 Tumor necrosis factor receptor 1
 P55, a state regional road in Latvia